The translations of The Lord of the Rings into Swedish have been the subject of controversy. In particular, Tolkien took issue with the version made by the first Swedish translator, Åke Ohlmarks, where he and Swedish fans detected numerous errors. That translation was superseded in 2005 by a new translation by Erik Andersson.

Åke Ohlmarks 1959–1961 

Åke Ohlmarks (1911–1984) was a prolific translator, who during his career published Swedish versions of Shakespeare, Dante and the Qur'an. 

Dubious translations include Vattnadal "Water-dale" for Rivendell, apparently by way of taking riven for river, while Esgaroth becomes Snigelöv "Snail-leavings", apparently by association with French escargot, "snail". The Ent Quickbeam becomes Snabba solstrålen, "Swift Sunbeam", apparently taking beam in the sense of "beam of light" instead of "tree", ignoring the fact that all Ents have names connected with trees. 

Ohlmarks sometimes offers multiple translations for names; for example, he renders Isengard variously as Isengard, Isengård, Isendor or Isendal.

In terms of style, Ohlmark's prose is hyperbolic and laden with poetic archaisms, where the original uses simple or even laconic language.  The translation contains numerous factual errors, straightforward mistranslations of idiomatic expressions and non-sequiturs, such as

"Three stars and seven stones / And the whitest tree you may see." for
"Seven stars and seven stones / And one white tree."

Ohlmarks' translation was the only one available in Swedish for forty years, and throughout his life he remained impervious to the numerous complaints and calls for revision from readers.

After The Silmarillion was published in 1977, Tolkien's son and literary executor Christopher Tolkien consented to a Swedish translation only on the condition that Ohlmarks have nothing to do with it; the translation was made by Roland Adlerberth. 
After a fire in his home in 1982, Ohlmarks incoherently charged Tolkien fans with arson. He subsequently published a book connecting Tolkien with "black magic" and Nazism, including fanciful constructions such as deriving the name Saruman from "SA man" with an interposed Ruhm "glory", and  conspiracy theories surrounding the Tolkien Society.

 Tolkien's view 

The book's author, J. R. R. Tolkien, intensely disliked Ohlmarks' translation of The Lord of the Rings. He disliked it even more than Shuchart's Dutch translation, as is evident from a 1957 letter to his publisher Rayner Unwin:

Examples singled out by Tolkien in the same letter include:Ford of Bruinen = Björnavad!("Bear-Ford")
Archet = Gamleby (a mere guess, I suppose, from 'archaic'?)
Mountains of Lune (Ered Luin) = Månbergen;  ("Moon Mountains")
Gladden Fields (in spite of descr. in I. 62) = Ljusa slätterna "Bright Plains"

Reception in Sweden 

Some of the initial reception was warm; the author and translator Sven Stolpe wrote in Aftonbladet that "He has made a "swedification" (försvenskning) – he has found wonderful, magnificent, Swedish compound words, he has translated poem after poem with great inspiration, there is not a page in his magnum opus that does not read like original Swedish work by a brilliant poet". , reviewing the book for Dagens Nyheter, listed some objections but wrote that "I only list these objections so that I can with greater emphasis praise the translation as a whole: it is magnificent."

Later, the translation's reception became more hostile. In 2000,  of Lund University's Institute of Linguistics, noting among other things the confusion between Eowyn and Merry in the Battle of the Pelennor Fields, wrote that "There can be no doubt that the Swedish translation is defective and in many ways a failure".

In 2004, Malte Persson wrote in Göteborgsposten that the translation was "so full of misunderstandings, misconceptions, inconsistencies, and arbitrary additions that it must mean that Ohlmark was either significantly worse at English than Icelandic, or that he had not taken the assignment seriously".

Erik Andersson and Lotta Olsson, 2005

This translation is considered much closer to the original, and abides by Tolkien's instructions. In the translation process, Andersson had access to a team of Tolkien fans as advisors. A sample of the prose was translated as follows:

A sample of Tolkien's verse was translated like this:

 * Both sämja and tämja can mean "to tame".

In 2007, Andersson together with  translated The Hobbit, making it the third Swedish translation of this book, but the first time that The Hobbit and The Lord of the Rings were available in Swedish from the same translator.

Reception 

The 2005 translation project attracted great interest from both Tolkien fans and the Swedish media. Dagens Nyheter wrote: "Let me say that Andersson & Olsson have prepared a readable, even and in large part correct translation, a test of a very robust piece of work that deserves deep respect, but also a careful review". Aftonbladet wrote of the poetry that "Lotta Olsson has had the thankless task of translating the book's numerous verses which many readers skip, though she does it well and economically". Malte Persson wrote in Göteborgsposten that "the new translation follows the original's fluent prose very closely, and only a linguistic pedant could find anything to object to".

In 2007 Andersson published a book called Översättarens anmärkningar ("The translator's remarks") based on his diary during the project.

See also

Translations of The Lord of the Rings

References

Bibliography

Ohlmarks' translation of The Lord of the Rings:

  (Volume 1)
  (Volume 2)
  (Volume 3)

Andersson and Olsson's translation of The Lord of the Rings:
  (Volume 1)
  (Volume 2)
  (Volume 3)

Translations of The Hobbit:
 
 
 

Swedish
Lord of the Rings
Literature controversies
Controversies in Sweden

fr:Traductions du Seigneur des anneaux#Traduction suédoise